The 2020 USA Cross Country Championships was the 130th edition of the USA Cross Country Championships. The USA Cross Country Championships took place in San Diego, California, on 18 January 2020 and served as the US Trials for 4th edition of 2020 Pan American Cross Country Cup (6 member teams) in Victoria, Canada. The men's race was won by Anthony Rotich in 30:17. The women's race was won by Natosha Rogers in a time of 35:44. The junior (U-20) men's race was won by Corey Gorgas in 25:44. The junior (U-20) women's race was won by Brooke Rauber in a time of 22:11

Results 
Race results

Men

Women

U-20 Men

U-20 Women

References

External links
USA Cross Country
2020 USA Cross Country results

2020
USA Cross Country Championships
USA Cross Country Championships
USA Cross Country Championships
USA Cross Country Championships
Sports competitions in San Diego